Speak (formerly Speak for Yourself) is an American sports talk show starring Emmanuel Acho, LeSean McCoy, Joy Taylor, and David Helman. The series premiered on June 13, 2016, on Fox Sports 1. In September 2018, Marcellus Wiley replaced Colin Cowherd as Jason Whitlock's  co-host. Also in 2018, the show added two sidekicks, Uncle Jimmy (Dodds) and Darnell Smith. On June 1, 2020, the show's long-term host and show-creator Jason Whitlock left Fox Sports. On June 10, former NFL linebacker Emmanuel Acho was named Wiley's new co-host. Wiley announced his departure in July 2022. The show debuted under its new name, "Speak," on September 6, 2022.

The show frequently features guest stars. Former NFL stars LaVar Arrington, T.J. Houshmandzadeh, James Harrison, Eric Dickerson, Tony Gonzalez and Michael Vick are frequent contributors to the show, as well as former NBA veteran Jim Jackson and NBA reporter Ric Bucher.

The show is known for its distinctive, sometimes controversial viewpoints on topics that tie sports and politics together. Former host Whitlock was an unapologetic supporter of football and the NFL. Whitlock and Wiley, unlike most of the sports media, consistently expressed skepticism of former NFL quarterback Colin Kaepernick's motives as it relates to his protest during the national anthem. Whitlock was also a frequent critic of NBA star LeBron James and the shoe company that markets James, Nike.

References

2010s American television talk shows
2016 American television series debuts
American sports television series
Fox Sports 1 original programming